Isabel Marie Bernadette Torres  (b.1965) is Professor of Spanish Golden Age Literature at Queen’s University Belfast.

Biography
Torres gained her Bachelor's degree and PhD from Queen's University. She was elected as member of the Royal Irish Academy in 2019, and as a Fellow of the British Academy in 2020.

References

Living people
1965 births
Fellows of the British Academy
Members of the Royal Irish Academy
Academics of Queen's University Belfast
Alumni of Queen's University Belfast
Spanish literature academics